Bagahi may refer to areas in Nepal:

Bagahi, Parsa, Nepal
Bagahi, Rautahat, Nepal